Hotan (also known as Gosthana, Gaustana, Godana, Godaniya, Khotan, Hetian, Hotien) is a major oasis town in southwestern Xinjiang, an autonomous region in Western China. The city proper of Hotan broke off from the larger Hotan County to become an administrative area in its own right in August 1984. It is the seat of Hotan Prefecture.

It lies just north of the Kunlun Mountains, which are crossed by the Sanju, Hindutash and Ilchi passes. The town, located southeast of Yarkant County and populated almost exclusively by Uyghurs, is a minor agricultural center. An important station on the southern branch of the historic Silk Road, Hotan has always depended on two strong rivers—the Karakash River and the White Jade River to provide the water needed to survive on the southwestern edge of the vast Taklamakan Desert. The White Jade River still provides water and irrigation for the town and oasis.

Etymology
The original name of Hotan is Godana, Gosthana/Gausthana/Gaustana or Godaniya, the name used in Sanskrit cosmological texts and also how the area is historically referred to as.

Gosthana/Gausthana/Gaustana/Godana/Godaniya translates to "land of cows" in Sanskrit. In Chinese, the same name is written as Yu-t'ien, pronounced as Gu-dana. The pronunciation changed over the years to Kho-tan. In the 7th century, Xuanzang tried to reverse interpret it in Sanskrit as Kustana. However, the Tibetans continue to call it Gosthana, which also carries the meaning of "land of cows".

An alternative etymology is proposed by Bailey, referring to the oldest indigenous form Hvatana, with hva- meaning "own, owned", whence "Lord" as in MP. "khwa-day".

History
 

The oasis of Hotan is strategically located at the junction of the southern (and most ancient) branch of the Silk Road joining China and the West with one of the main routes from ancient India and Tibet to Central Asia and distant China. It provided a convenient meeting place where not only goods, but technologies, philosophies, and religions were transmitted from one culture to another.

Tocharians lived in this region over 2000 years ago. Several of the Tarim mummies were found in the region. The excavated sites range from about 300 BCE to 100 CE. The excavated graves have produced a number of fabrics of felt, wool, silk and cotton and even a fine bit of tapestry, the Sampul tapestry, showing the face of Caucasoid man which was made of threads of 24 shades of color. The tapestry had been cut up and fashioned into trousers worn by one of the deceased. An Anthropological study of 56 individuals showed a primarily Caucasoid population. A study in 2010 showed that an Eastern Eurasian lineage common in Siberia dominates the mitochondrial DNA of the mummies from the Xiaohe Cemetery. Their Y chromosome is distributed throughout Eastern Europe, South Asia, Central Asia, and Siberia.

There is a relative abundance of information on Hotan readily available for study. The main historical sources are to be found in the Chinese histories (particularly detailed during the Han and early Tang dynasties) when China was interested in control of the Western Regions, the accounts of several Chinese pilgrim monks, a few Buddhist histories of Hotan that have survived in Classical Tibetan and a large number of documents in the Iranian Saka language and other languages discovered, for the most part, early this century at various sites in the Tarim Basin and from the hidden library at the Mogao Caves near Dunhuang.

Buddhist Khotan

The ancient Kingdom of Khotan was one of the earliest Buddhist states in the world and a cultural bridge across which Buddhist culture and learning were transmitted from India to China.  Its capital was located to the west of the modern city of Hotan. The inhabitants of the Kingdom of Khotan, like those of early Kashgar and Yarkant, spoke Saka, one of the Eastern Iranian languages. Khotan's indigenous dynasty (all of whose royal names are Indian in origin) governed a fervently Buddhist city-state boasting some 400 temples in the late 9th/early 10th century—four times the number recorded by Xuanzang around 630. The kingdom was independent but was intermittently under Chinese control during the Han and Tang Dynasty.

After the Tang dynasty, Khotan formed an alliance with the rulers of Dunhuang. Khotan enjoyed close relations with the Buddhist centre at Dunhuang: the Khotanese royal family intermarried with Dunhuang élites, visited and patronized Dunhuang's Buddhist temple complex, and donated money to have their portraits painted on the walls of the Mogao grottos. Through the 10th century, Khotanese royal portraits were painted in association with an increasing number of deities in the caves. Besides this, a particular site, Melikawat functioned as a major Buddhist center in the Kingdom of Khotan.

In the 10th century, Khotan began a struggle with the Kara-Khanid Khanate, a Turkic state.  The Kara-Khanid ruler, Sultan Satuq Bughra Khan, had converted to Islam:

Some Khotanese Buddhist works were unearthed.

The rulers of Khotan were aware of the menace they faced since they arranged for the Mogao grottoes to paint a growing number of divine figures along with themselves. Halfway in the 10th century Khotan came under attack by the Qarakhanid ruler Musa, and in what proved to be a pivotal moment in the Turkification and Islamification of the Tarim Basin, the Karakhanid leader Yusuf Qadir Khan conquered Khotan around 1006.

Islamic Khotan
Yūsuf Qadr Khān was a brother or cousin of the Muslim ruler of Kashgar and Balasagun, Khotan lost its independence and between 1006 and 1165, became part of the Kara-Khanid Khanate.  Later it fell to the Kara-Khitan Khanate, after which it was ruled by the Mongols.

When Marco Polo visited Khotan in the 13th century, he noted that the people were all Muslim.  He wrote that:

19th century

The town suffered severely during the Dungan Revolt (1862–77) against the Qing dynasty and again a few years later when Yaqub Beg of Kashgar made himself master of Kashgaria, ruling the newly founded Turkic state known at the time as Yettishar.

Post-Qing

Qing imperial authority collapsed in 1912. During the Republican era in China, warlords and local ethnic self-determination movements wrestled over control of Xinjiang. Abdullah Bughra, Nur Ahmad Jan Bughra, and Muhammad Amin Bughra declared themselves Emirs of Khotan during the Kumul Rebellion. Tunganistan was an independent administered region in the southern part of Xinjiang from 1934 to 1937. The territory included the oases of the southern Tarim Basin; the centre of the region was Khotan. Beginning with the Islamic rebellion in 1937, Hotan and the rest of the province came under the control of warlord Sheng Shicai. Sheng was later ousted by the Kuomintang.

People's Republic of China
Shortly after the Communists won the civil war in 1949, Hotan was incorporated into the People's Republic of China.

In 1983/4, the urban area of Hotan was administratively split from the larger Hotan County, and from then on governed as a county-level city.

On July 11, 2006, the townships of Jiya and Yurungqash (Yulongkashi) in Lop County and Tusalla (Tushala) in Hotan County were transferred to Hotan City.

Following the July 2009 Ürümqi riots, ethnic tensions rose in Xinjiang and in Hotan in particular. As a result, the city has seen occasional bouts of violence. In June 2011, Hotan opened its first passenger-train service to Kashgar, which was established as a special economic zone following the riots. In July of the same year, a bomb and knife attack occurred on the city's central thoroughfare. In June 2011, authorities in Hotan Prefecture sentenced Uyghur Muslim Hebibullah Ibrahim to ten years imprisonment for selling "illegal religious materials". In June 2012, Tianjin Airlines Flight 7554 was hijacked en route from Hotan to Ürümqi.

In a report from the Uyghur American Association, in June 2012, notice was said to be given that police planned to undertake a search of every residence in Gujanbagh (Gujiangbage), Hotan. Hotan is the last municipality in Xinjiang with a majority Ugyhur presence in the core of the city. The UAA viewed this as an attempt to systematically intimidate the Uyghur population in Hotan.

The Sultanim Cemetery in central Hotan was a historical Uyghur graveyard that also included a religious shrine. According to a 2019 interview by the Uyghur Human Rights Project, the cemetery entombed four commanders of Sultan Satuq Bughra Khan, who conquered the city around 960 CE and spread Islam. Due to space limitations after over a thousand years of burials, multiple bodies had to reuse the same grave, and additionals layers were dug underneath old ones. Between 2018 and 2019, the cemetery was demolished and the western part of the land turned into a parking lot.

Geography and climate

Hotan has a temperate zone, cold desert climate (Köppen BWk), with a mean annual total of only  of precipitation falling on 17.3 days of the year. Due to its southerly location in Xinjiang just north of the Kunlun Mountains, during winter it is one of the warmest locations in the region, with average high temperatures remaining above freezing throughout the year. The diurnal temperature variation is not large for a desert, averaging  annually. Although no month averages less than half of possible sunshine, the city only receives 2,587 hours of bright sunshine annually, which is on the low end for Xinjiang; monthly percent possible sunshine ranges from 50% in March to 75% in October.

Administrative divisions

The city includes four subdistricts, three towns, five townships and two other areas:

Subdistricts:
 Nurbag Subdistrict (Nu'erbage; /), Gujanbagh Subdistrict (Gujiangbage), Gulbagh Subdistrict (Gulebage), Na'erbage Subdistrict

Towns:

Townships:
 Shorbagh Township (Xiao'erbage;  / ), Ilchi Township (Yiliqi;  / ), Gujanbagh Township (Gujiangbage;  / ), Jiya Township ( / ), Aqchal Township (Akeqiale  / )

Others:
 Beijing Industrial Park, Hotan City Jinghe Logistics Park

Demographics

Hotan is largely dominated by the Uyghurs, and as of 2015, 311,050 of the 348,289 residents of the county were Uyghur, 35,897 were Han Chinese and 1,342 were from other ethnic groups.

In 1940, Owen Lattimore quoted the population of Khotan to be estimated as 26,000.

In 1998 the urban population was recorded at 154,352, 83% of which were Uyghurs, and 17% were Han Chinese.

In 1999, 83.01% of the population was Uyghur and 16.57% of the population was Han Chinese.

In the 2000 census, the population was recorded as 186,123. In the 2010 census figure, the figure had risen to 322,300. The increase in population is partly due to boundary changes.

Transportation

Air
Hotan Airport (IATA: HTN) serves the city. It serves regional flights to Ürümqi. Originally a military use airport, it was expanded significantly in 2002 to accommodate higher passenger volumes.

Road
Hotan is served by China National Highway 315, which runs along the southern Tarim Basin from Ruoqiang to Kashgar, and the Trans-Taklamakan Desert Highway, which run north to Luntai. An expressway is being built between Hotan and Karakax County (Moyu) as of 2014.

Rail
Hotan is connected to the rest of China's rail network via the Kashgar–Hotan Railway, which opened to freight traffic in December 2010, and passenger service in June 2011.  The railway station was constructed by a company under the Xinjiang Production and Construction Corps, and is located in the town of Lasqi northwest of the city proper.  Passenger train service on this line is limited, with only one train per day, local service 5828/5825, linking the city with Kashgar (8~ hours) and Ürümqi (~34 hours).

Buses
Regular bus services link Hotan with Kashgar. There is also an express bus to Aksu via the  'Hotan-Aksu Cross-Desert Highway' which was opened in 2007, travels alongside the intermittent Hotan River, and which takes about 5 or 6 hours. This same bus then goes on to Urumchi taking a total of about 21 hours from Hotan.

Economy

, there was about 100,000 acres (662,334 mu) of cultivated land in Khotan.

Nephrite jade
Chinese historical sources indicate that Hotan was the main source of the nephrite jade used in ancient China. For several hundred years, until they were defeated by the Xiongnu in 176 BCE, the trade of Khotanese jade into China was controlled by the nomadic Yuezhi. The Chinese still refer to the Yurungkash as the White Jade River, alluding to the white jade recovered from its alluvial deposits. The light-colored jade is called "Mutton fat" jade. Most of the jade is now gone, with only a few kilos of good quality jade found yearly. Some is still mined in the Kunlun Mountains to the south in the summer, but it is generally of poorer quality than that found in the rivers.

Fabrics and carpets

Khotanese textiles were mentioned by Xuanzang, who visited the oasis in 644 CE. In his Biography it is stated: "It produced carpets and fine felt, and the felt-makers also spun coarse and fine silk."

Ancient Chinese-Khotanese relations were so close that the oasis emerged as one of the earliest centres of silk manufacture outside China. There are good reasons to believe that the silk-producing industry flourished in Hotan as early as the 5th century. According to one story, a Chinese princess given in marriage to a Khotan prince brought to the oasis the secret of silk-manufacture, "hiding silkworms in her hair as part of her dowry", probably in the first half of the 1st century CE. It was from Khotan that the eggs of silkworms were smuggled to Iran, reaching Justinian I's Constantinople in 551.Silk production is still a major industry employing more than a thousand workers and producing some 150 million metres of silk annually. Silk weaving by Uyghur women is a thriving cottage industry, some of it produced using traditional methods. Hotan Silk Factory is one of the notable silk producers in Hotan.

Atlas is the fabric used for traditional Uyghur clothing worn by Uyghur women. It is soft, light and graceful tie-dyed silk fabric. It comes various colors, the brighter and rich colors are for small children to young ladies. The gray and dark colors are for elderly women.

The oldest piece of kilim which we have any knowledge was obtained by the archaeological explorer Aurel Stein; a fragment from an ancient settlement near Hotan, which was buried by sand drifts about the fourth century CE. The weave is almost identical with that of modern kilims.

Hotanese pile carpets are still highly prized and form an important export.

Notable persons
 Islam Akhun
 Muhammad Amin Bughra
 Nur Ahmadjan Bughra
 Abdullah Bughra

Gallery

See also
Atlas silk
Dandan Oilik
Hotan Cultural Museum
Khatana
Kingdom of Khotan
Silk Road transmission of Buddhism

Notes

References

Citations

Sources 

 Harper, Damian et al. (2009). Lonely Planet China: 11th Edition. Lonely Planet. .
  Updated version of this article is available for free download (with registration) at: independent.academia.edu
 Hulsewé, A. F. P. (1979). China in Central Asia: The Early Stage 125 BC − AD 23: an annotated translation of chapters 61 and 96 of the History of the Former Han Dynasty. E. J. Brill, Leiden. .
 Legge, James 1886. A Record of Buddhistic Kingdoms: Being an account by the Chinese Monk Fa-Hien of his travels in India and Ceylon (A.D. 399-414) in search of the Buddhist Books of Discipline. Oxford, Clarendon Press. Reprint: New York, Paragon Book Reprint Corp. 1965.
 Mallory, J. P. and Mair, Victor H. 2000. The Tarim Mummies: Ancient China and the Mystery of the Earliest Peoples from the West. Thames & Hudson. London. 2000.
 Montell, Gösta, Sven Hedin's Archaeological Collections from Khotan: Terra-cottas from Yotkan and Dandan-Uiliq, The Bulletin of the Museum of Far Eastern Antiquities 7 (1936), pp. 145–221.
 Montell, Gösta, Sven Hedin's Archaeological Collections from Khotan II (appendix by Helmer Smith (pp. 101–102)), The Bulletin of the Museum of Far Eastern Antiquities 10 (1938), pp. 83–113.
 Puri, B. N. Buddhism in Central Asia, Motilal Banarsidass Publishers Private Limited, Delhi, 1987. (2000 reprint).
 Stein, Aurel M. 1907. Ancient Khotan: Detailed report of archaeological explorations in Chinese Turkestan, 2 vols. Clarendon Press. Oxford. dsr.nii.ac.jp 1907. Ancient Khotan: Detailed report of archaeological explorations in Chinese Turkestan, 2 vols. Clarendon Press. Oxford. Ancient Khotan : vol.1 Ancient Khotan : vol.2
 Stein, Aurel M. 1921. Serindia: Detailed report of explorations in Central Asia and westernmost China, 5 vols. London & Oxford. Clarendon Press. Reprint: Delhi. Motilal Banarsidass. 1980. dsr.nii.ac.jp
 1904  Sand-Buried Ruins of Khotan, London, Hurst and Blackett, Ltd. Reprint Asian Educational Services, New Delhi, Madras, 2000 Sand-Buried Ruins of Khotan : vol.1
 Watters, Thomas 1904–1905. On Yuan Chwang's Travels in India. London. Royal Asiatic Society. Reprint: Delhi. Mushiram Manoharlal. 1973.
 Yu, Taishan. 2004. A History of the Relationships between the Western and Eastern Han, Wei, Jin, Northern and Southern Dynasties and the Western Regions. Sino-Platonic Papers No. 131 March 2004. Dept. of East Asian Languages and Civilizations, University of Pennsylvania.

External links 

Official government site (in Chinese)
Silk Road Seattle - University of Washington (The Silk Road Seattle website contains many useful resources including a number of full-text historical works)
Site devoted to the Buddhism of Khotan with a copy of Sir Aurel Stein's map of the Tarim Basin and Khotan region
 Satellite image of region which can be enlarged
China:  Taklamakan - Desert With No Ocean Underground
 
 "Khotan", Encyclopaedia Iranica 

 
Populated places along the Silk Road
Populated places in Xinjiang
Ancient peoples of China
Former countries in Chinese history
Oases of China
Hotan Prefecture
Uyghurs
County-level divisions of Xinjiang